Icing is the debut album by noise rock trio Cherubs, released in 1992 through Trance Syndicate. The track "Pink Party Dessert" was released as a single on 7" vinyl, and it was even played by John Peel on BBC Radio 1.

Track listing

Personnel
Cherubs
Owen McMahon – bass guitar, vocals
Brent Prager – drums
Kevin Whitley – guitar, vocals
Production and additional personnel
Mr. Colson – production, engineering, recording

Release history

References

External links 
 

1992 debut albums
Cherubs (American band) albums
Trance Syndicate albums